Hwe or HWE may refer to:
 Hwe (Cyrillic), a letter of the Cyrillic script
 Hwe language, spoken in Ghana, Togo, and Benin
 Hardy–Weinberg equilibrium
 Home War Establishment of the Royal Canadian Air Force
 Horner–Wadsworth–Emmons reaction
 Hostile work environment, a term of art in United States labor law
 Hot water extraction
 Sunwoo Hwe, South Korean writer
 Hardware Enablement, a Linux kernel issue inbetween stable kernel versions to catch up with newest hardware technologies; opposed by General Availability (GA)

See also 
 Hoe (food) (pronounced hwe), a Korean dish